Andrey Ivanov (born 28 May 1976) is a Russian swimmer. He competed in the men's 200 metre breaststroke event at the 1996 Summer Olympics.

References

1976 births
Living people
Russian male swimmers
Olympic swimmers of Russia
Swimmers at the 1996 Summer Olympics
Place of birth missing (living people)
Male breaststroke swimmers